Only Make Believe is the second studio album by American funk/soul group Bell & James, released in 1979 by A&M Records.

Critical reception
Stereo Review deemed the album a "Recording of Special Merit," writing that "there is an airiness to the melodies, which have a flavor often more reminiscent of Hall and Oates than of r-&-b."

Track listing

Credits
Drums, Guitar, Percussion, Congas, Vocals – LeRoy Bell
Executive Producer – Thom Bell
Keyboards, Synthesizer, Guitar, Bass, Percussion, Vocals – Casey James
Management – Dick Broder
Producer – Bell & James

References

1979 albums
Albums produced by Thom Bell
A&M Records albums